Oeceoclades peyrotii is a species of terrestrial orchid in the genus Oeceoclades that is endemic to southwestern Madagascar. It was first described by the French botanists Jean Marie Bosser and Philippe Morat in 2001. The specific epithet peyrotii was given to this species in honor of Dr. Jean-Pierre Peyrot whose observations and collections have led to a better understanding of Malagasy orchids.

Description
Each pseudobulb has a single ovate-pointed, leathery leaf with slightly wavy margins. The leaves are dark green on the upper surface and purplish on the underside, sometimes with darker stripes.

Oeceoclades peyrotii is a terrestrial species found growing in deciduous forests of southwestern Madagascar, where it is known from only four locations. It is similar to other small-flowered species such as O. rauhii, O. analavelensis, and O. analamerensis but can be distinguished from those species by the differing characters of the labellum and spur and by the length of the petiole.

References

peyrotii
Endemic flora of Madagascar
Plants described in 2001